Augusto Manuel Ferreira Cardoso Pereira (born December 13, 1972) is a Portuguese race walker. He set a personal best time of 3:55:14, by finishing sixteenth for the men's 50 km at the 2007 European Race Walking Cup in Royal Leamington Spa, England.

Cardoso represented Portugal at the 2008 Summer Olympics in Beijing, where he competed for the men's 50 km race walk, along with his teammate António Pereira. He successfully finished the race in fortieth place by twenty-eight seconds behind United States' Philip Dunn, with a time of 4:09:00.

References

External links

NBC Olympics Profile

1972 births
Living people
Portuguese male racewalkers
Olympic athletes of Portugal
Athletes (track and field) at the 2008 Summer Olympics